The donkey burger is a kind of sandwich commonly eaten in Baoding and Hejian, Hebei Province, China, where it is considered a local specialty, though it may also be found in other parts of China, particularly in northeastern China. Chopped or shredded donkey meat or offal is placed within a huǒshāo or shao bing, a roasted, semi-flaky bread pocket, and eaten as a snack or as part of a meal. Hejian style typically serves the meat cold in a warm huoshao while Baoding style serves the meat hot, they both often include green chili-pepper and cilantro leaves. Donkey burger is a popular street food and can also be found on the menus of high-end restaurants.

A well-known saying, especially in Baoding (and elsewhere in Hebei province), is "In Heaven there is dragon meat, on Earth there is donkey meat".

Donkey burgers have two styles: Baoding style and Hejian style. Baoding style uses round huoshao, while Hejian style uses rectangular huoshao. Also, the inside donkey burgers are different: Baoding style serves hot meat, while Hejian style serves cold meat.

Donkey burgers have been traced to the Ming Dynasty.

See also
 List of sandwiches
 List of street foods

References

Further reading
 

Baoding
Chinese cuisine
Donkeys
Sandwiches